Winslade is a British surname. Notable people with the name include:

 Charlie Winslade (1931–1993), Welsh rugby player
 Glenn Winslade (born 1958), Australian operatic tenor
 Jack Winslade (born 1995), English cricketer
 Phil Winslade, British comic book artist
 Rose Winslade (1919–1981), British engineer
 Tom Winslade (born 1990), English cricketer
 William J. Winslade (born 1941), American philosopher
 Zane Winslade (born 1983), New Zealand rugby union footballer

References 

English-language surnames